The 1991 Italian Open (known as the Peugeot Italian Open for sponsorship reasons) was a tennis tournament played on outdoor clay courts. It was the 48th edition of the Italian Open, and was part of the ATP Super 9 of the 1991 ATP Tour, and of the Tier I Series of the 1991 WTA Tour. Both the men's and the women's events were held at the Foro Italico in Rome, Italy. The women's tournament was played from 6 May until 12 May 1991, and the men's tournament was played from 13 May until 20 May 1991. Emilio Sánchez and Gabriela Sabatini won the singles titles.

Finals

Men's singles

 Emilio Sánchez defeated  Alberto Mancini 6–3, 6–1, 3–0 (retired)
It was Emilio Sánchez 2nd title of the year and his 13th overall. It was his 1st career Masters title.

Women's singles

 Gabriela Sabatini defeated  Monica Seles 6–3, 6–2
It was Sabatini's 5th title of the year and her 20th overall. It was her 3rd Tier I title of the year and her 4th overall. It was her 3rd title at the event, also winning in 1988 and 1989.

Men's doubles

 Omar Camporese /  Goran Ivanišević defeated  Luke Jensen /  Laurie Warder 6–2, 6–3

Women's doubles

 Jennifer Capriati /  Monica Seles defeated  Nicole Bradtke /  Elna Reinach 7–5, 6–2

References

External links
Official website
Women's Singles, Doubles and Qualifying Singles Draws

 
Italian Open (tennis)
Italian Open
May 1991 sports events in Europe